James Gordon Rotherham Hayward (31 December 1926 – 29 September 2014) was an English cricketer. Hayward was a left-handed batsman who bowled right-arm fast-medium. He was born at Speeton, East Riding of Yorkshire.

Hayward made a single first-class appearance for Nottinghamshire against Oxford University 1951 at the University Parks. Hayward wasn't called upon to bat during the match, but did take two wickets in Oxford University's first-innings, dismissing John Marshall and Richard Wollocombe to finish with figures of 2/78 from 36 overs. His only first-class appearance ended in a draw.

Hayward died on 29 September 2014, at the age of 87.

References

External links

1926 births
2014 deaths
People from the Borough of Scarborough
English cricketers
Nottinghamshire cricketers
Cricketers from Yorkshire
Cricketers from Scarborough, North Yorkshire